Sam Waterston is an American actor known for his stage and screen performances. 

Waterston received an Academy Award nomination for Best Actor for his performance in The Killing Fields (1984) losing to F. Murray Abraham for his role in Amadeus (1984). He also received a Tony Award nomination for Best Actor in a Play for his performance in the Broadway revival of Abe Lincoln in Illinois. 

Waterston is known for his role in the popular long running crime series Law and Order for which he received 3 Primetime Emmy Award nominations and a Golden Globe Award nomination. He also received 11 Screen Actors Guild Award nominations for Law and Order winning in 1999 for Outstanding Performance by a Male Actor in a Drama Series. He also received 3 Primetime Emmy Award nominations for I'll Fly Away as well as two Golden Globe Award nominations for the series, winning in 1994.

Major associations

Academy Awards

Primetime Emmy Awards

Tony Awards

Industry awards

BAFTA Awards

Drama Desk Awards

Golden Globe Awards

Screen Actors Guild Awards

Miscellaneous awards

Satellite Awards

Viewers for Quality Television

References 

Lists of awards received by American actor